The Vaccine Research Center (VRC), is an intramural division of the National Institute of Allergy and Infectious Diseases (NIAID), part of the National Institutes of Health (NIH), US Department of Health and Human Services (HHS). The mission of the VRC is to discover and develop both vaccines and antibody-based products that target infectious diseases. 

The broad research portfolio of the VRC includes basic, clinical, and translational research into vaccines for HIV, Ebola, Marburg, and RSV, among other viruses, and therapeutic antibodies against SARS-CoV-2 (the virus responsible for COVID-19) and other pathogens.

History

The origins of the Vaccine Research Center date back to 1996 following discussions between President Bill Clinton and NIAID Director Dr. Anthony Fauci regarding research addressing HIV/AIDS. Recognizing the potential impact a vaccine could make in decreasing the global public health burden of HIV, President Clinton in 1997 announced a plan to establish an HIV vaccine research center on the NIH campus. The dedication ceremony for the VRC took place in 1999 with President Clinton delivering the opening remarks. 

Named in honor of immunization advocates former Governor of Arkansas Dale Bumpers and his wife Betty Flanagan Bumpers, the Vaccine Research Center opened its doors as Building 40 on the NIH campus in 2000. The founding investigators leading the new center came from a range of scientific disciplines including virology, immunology, structural biology, bioengineering, manufacturing, clinical research and regulatory science. While HIV vaccine research and development remains a core focus, the scope of activities has expanded to include advancing scientific understanding and developing biologics for a broad array of infectious pathogens.

Leadership:

2000 - 2012

Director: Gary J. Nabel

Deputy Director: John R. Mascola

2013 – Present

Director: John R. Mascola

Deputy Directors: Richard A. Koup, Julie E. Ledgerwood, Barney S. Graham (ret. 2021)

Organization 
The VRC is composed of an Office of the Director, basic research laboratories and major programs.

Office of the Director:

 Management and Operations
 Scientific Partnerships and Collaborations
 Strategic Planning

Laboratories:

 Immunology Laboratory
 Cellular Immunology Section
 Flow Cytometry Core
 The Genome Analysis Core
 Human Immunology Section
 Immunology Section
 ImmunoTechnology Section
 Integrative Bioinformatics of Immune Systems Core
 Nonhuman Primate Immunogenicity Core
 Pandemic Response Repository through Microbial and Immune Surveillance and Epidemiology (PREMISE)
 Tissue Analysis Core
 Virus Persistence and Dynamics Section

 Virology Laboratory
 Humoral Immunology Core
 Humoral Immunology Section
 Structural Bioinformatics Core
 Structural Biology Section
 Virology Core

 Viral Pathogenesis Laboratory
 Biodefense Research Section
 Molecular ImmunoEngineering Section
 Translational Science Core
 Yeast Engineering Technology and Immunobiology Core

Programs:

 Clinical Trials Program
 Regulatory Science and Strategy Program
 Translational Research Program
 Vaccine Immunology Program
 Vaccine Production Program

Research Areas 
To advance scientific understanding of infectious pathogens and develop investigational biologics, the VRC maintains programs in the following:

Key scientific areas:

 Disease acquisition and viral pathogenesis
 Infection and vaccine-induced immune responses
 Structure-based vaccine design
 Structural basis for antibody-mediated virus neutralization
 Vaccine antigens, antibody platforms, and routes of delivery

Primary disease-specific programs:

 Alphaviruses (Chikungunya, Western/Eastern/Venezuelan Equine Encephalitis)
 Coronaviruses (SARS, MERS, SARS-CoV-2)
 Enterovirus D68
 Filoviruses (Ebola and Marburg)
 HIV/AIDS
 Influenza
 Malaria
 Nipah Virus
 Paramyxoviruses (Parainfluenza Virus and Human Metapneumovirus)
 Respiratory Syncytial Virus
 Tuberculosis
 Zika Virus

Projects

HIV 
In July 2010, a collaboration between the National Institute of Allergy and Infectious Diseases and officials at the Vaccine Research Center found that two human HIV antibodies, named VRC01 and VRC03, could potentially be used against a wide range of types and mutations of HIV in the design of a preventive HIV vaccine for human use, as well as in the formation of better antiretroviral therapy drug cocktails. The discovery, a potentially landmark one in the drive to find a vaccine for AIDS should it be validated and further improved.

Ebola 
In 2016 research efforts led by Nancy Sullivan at Vaccine Research Center and J. J. Muyembe-Tamfum from the Institut National de Recherche Biomedicale (INRB) in the Democratic Republic of Congo resulted in the discovery of a monoclonal antibody,  mAb114, from a survivor from the 1995 Kikwit outbreak of Ebola virus disease. mAb114 is a monoclonal antibody therapy that is being evaluated as a treatment for Ebola virus disease and has shown great success by lowering the mortality rate from 70% to about 34% in the 2018-2020 Kivu Ebola Virus Outbreak. In August 2019, Congolese health authorities, the World Health Organization, and the U.S. National Institutes of Health promoted the use of mAb114, alongside a similar Regeneron-produced treatment, over other treatments yielding higher mortality rates, after ending clinical trials during the outbreak.

Image Gallery

Notes and references

External links 
 
 

Medical research institutes in Maryland
National Institute of Allergy and Infectious Diseases
Bethesda, Maryland